Turning back the army from Wihwa Island refers to the 1388 episode in which General Yi Seong-gye of the Goryeo dynasty was ordered to march north with his army and invade the Liaodong Peninsula (northeast China, which was under the control of the Ming dynasty), but instead decided to turn back to Kaesong and trigger a coup d'état. 

General Yi Seong-gye had gained power and respect during the late 1370s and early 1380s by pushing Mongol remnants off the Korean Peninsula and also by repelling well-organized Japanese pirates in a series of successful engagements. He was also credited with routing the Red Turbans when they made their move into the Korean Peninsula as part of their rebellion against the Yuan dynasty. Following in the wake of the rise of the Ming Dynasty under Zhu Yuanzhang, the royal court in Goryeo split into two competing factions: the group led by General Yi (supporting the Ming Dynasty) and the camp led by his rival General Choe (supporting the Yuan Dynasty).

When a Ming messenger came to Goryeo in 1388 (the 14th year of King U) to demand the return of a significant portion of Goryeo's northern territory, General Choe Yeong seized the opportunity and played upon the prevailing anti-Ming atmosphere to argue for the invasion of the Liaodong Peninsula (Goryeo claimed to be the successor of the ancient kingdom of Goguryeo; as such, restoring Manchuria as part of Korean territory was a tenet of its foreign policy throughout its history).

King U ordered General Yi to invade Liaodong Peninsula and attack the new Ming dynasty army in support of the Mongols, despite the General's protest. in 1388 Yi arrived at Wihwa Island ( = Weihua Island) on the Amrok River, also known as the Yalu River, and realized that the Ming forces outnumbered his own. Instead of invading he made a momentous decision, commonly called "Turning back the army from Wihwa Island", that would alter the course of Korean history. Knowing of the support he enjoyed both from high-ranking government officials, the general populace, and the great deterrent of Ming Empire under the Hongwu Emperor, Yi decided to revolt and swept back to the capital, Gaegyeong, to trigger a coup d'état and secure control of the government. This was the first of a series of Yi's rebellious actions that eventually led to the establishment of the Joseon dynasty. After being formed in July 1392, Yi's dynasty lasted until October 1897, when it was replaced by the Korean Empire.

In popular culture
 The 2014 period adventure film The Pirates begins with the Wihwado Retreat.
 The 2019 JTBC TV series My Country: The New Age shows a historical fiction account of the event.

See also
 Wihwa Island
 Ming campaign against the Uriankhai
 Crossing the Rubicon

References

 John K. Fairbank, "East Asia: Tradition and Transformation" (Harvard University Press, 1989)

Military history of the Ming dynasty
14th century in Korea
1388 in Asia
China–Korea relations